Youngs can refer to:

People:
Ben Youngs (b. 1989), English rugby union player
Elaine Youngs (b. 1970), American beach volleyball player
Jenny Owen Youngs (b. 1981), American singer-songwriter
Jim Youngs (b. 1956), American actor who appeared in such films as The Wanderers and Footloose
John Youngs (minister) (–1672), Puritan minister who founded Southold, New York
John E. Youngs (1883–1970), American politician
John William Theodore Youngs (1910–1970), American mathematician
Nick Youngs (b. 1959), former English rugby union footballer 
Richard Youngs (b. 1966), British musician 
Ross Youngs (1897–1927), American Major League Baseball outfielder 
Samuel Youngs (1760–1839), American schoolteacher who served as inspiration for the character Ichabod Crane

Places:
Youngs, California, a former town in El Dorado County
Youngs Bay, Oregon
Youngs River, tributary of the Columbia River in northwest Oregon
Youngs Siding, Western Australia, in the City of Albany, Australia

Companies
Young's, British pub chain
Young's Seafood, British fish company

See also
Young's modulus
Young's rule
Young's syndrome